Stephen Cone (born August 10, 1980) is an American filmmaker who has received early career retrospectives on the Criterion Channel, MUBI and at the Museum of the Moving Image, Berlin's Unknown Pleasures Festival and Manchester's Bigger Than Life. .

Early life
Cone was born in Louisville, Kentucky, and raised in South Carolina.  He moved to Chicago in 2004 and, in his words, taught himself to make movies "by making movies."

Career
In 2006, Cone wrote, produced, and directed his first short film Church Story with actors Isabel Liss, Bill McGough, and Arian Moayed.  In 2007, Cone followed with the short film Young Wives.  His medium-length film, a metaphysical drama called The Christians, was completed in 2008 and featured performances by J. Kingsford Goode, Bill McGough, Arian Moayed, Sadie Rogers, Laurel Schroeder, Krissy Shields, and Robert Belushi, oldest son of actor Jim Belushi.

Cone's next feature film, the full-length In Memoriam, released in 2011, follows a group of college students reenacting the last hours of two dead peers who fell to their deaths attempting to make love. In Memoriam was praised by film critic Roger Ebert as "a touching film."  Cone later reflected on the effect Ebert's review had, writing:

Cone's third theatrical film, the coming-of-age drama The Wise Kids, also released in 2011, was a critical success.  It also garnered praise from Roger Ebert, Variety'''s Robert Koehler, and Stephen Holden of The New York Times.  The film was a Critics' Pick for The New York Times and won the Grand Jury Prizes for U.S. Feature and Best Screenplay at Outfest. It was subsequently released on cable/VOD and DVD by Wolfe Video.

In 2013, Cone released his fourth theatrical film Black Box.  While not as widely seen as The Wise Kids due to an initial lack of distribution, the film garnered praise from Newcity's Ray Pride and Michael Phillips of the Chicago Tribune, who gave the film 3½ out of 4 stars and called it "a worthy follow-up to Cone's previous film." Black Box was later acquired by Devolver Digital Films for a late 2014 cable/VOD release.

Cone completed two unreleased experimental features in 2014, The Mystery of Life and This Afternoon, and in 2015 completed the coming-of-age drama Henry Gamble's Birthday Party.  Henry Gamble was featured in The New York Times "Anatomy of a Scene" series, screened within BAMcinemaFest and BFI Flare, and was the winner of the Silver Q Hugo Award at the 2015 Chicago International Film Festival. It is currently available to screen on Hulu. His latest film Princess Cyd''  appeared on Vanity Fair's Ten Best Films of the 2010s after appearing on multiple Best of 2017 lists including IndieWire, Vulture, Vanity Fair, Vox and NPR and screening at dozens of festivals worldwide including the BFI London Film Festival, BAMcinemaFest, Frameline and Maryland Film Festival. It was acquired for distribution by Wolfe Releasing and is also currently streaming on Hulu.

Filmography

References

External links

Criterion Channel interview clip
Three of his films on The Criterion Channel

1980 births
21st-century American male actors
21st-century American screenwriters
American film directors
American male film actors
American male screenwriters
Film directors from Illinois
Film directors from Kentucky
Film directors from South Carolina
LGBT people from Kentucky
Living people
Male actors from Chicago
Male actors from Louisville, Kentucky
Screenwriters from Illinois
Screenwriters from Kentucky
Screenwriters from South Carolina